Sonia Fowler (also Jackson)<ref>"Helpdesk", BBC'.' Retrieved 3 March 2007.</ref> is a fictional character from the BBC soap opera EastEnders, played by Natalie Cassidy. Cassidy took maternity leave in 2016 and Sonia left on 20 September 2016 for her dream job in Kettering. Cassidy made two guest stints during her maternity leave, on 25 December 2016 via webcam and for a three episode arc from 14 to 18 April 2017. She returned full-time on 27 June 2017. On 29 December 2020 it was announced that Cassidy would take an extended break from the show, with Sonia set to leave the Square to return in spring 2021. She departed on 8 January and returned on 16 April.

Sonia has been featured in storylines including affairs, feuds, bereavements, family problems, teenage pregnancy and a cancer scare. In 2000, Sonia discovers that she is pregnant at 15 and gives birth to a daughter Rebecca Fowler (Jasmine Armfield) whom she puts up for adoption. She begins a relationship with Jamie Mitchell (Jack Ryder) who is later killed on Christmas Day 2002. Sonia is better known for her problematic marriage with Martin Fowler (James Alexandrou/James Bye), which ends in 2006 when Sonia begins an affair with nurse Naomi Julien (Petra Letang). The pair eventually reconcile for their daughter Rebecca, however Sonia develops a feud with Martin's mother Pauline Fowler (Wendy Richard) which ends when Pauline is murdered. Sonia is originally arrested for her murder, however, it transpires that Pauline's husband Joe Macer (Ray Brooks) is her killer.

Since her return in 2014, Sonia's storyline has included divorcing Martin, coming out as bisexual, a cancer scare, an on-off feud with Stacey Slater (Lacey Turner), relationships with Tina Carter (Luisa Bradshaw-White) and  Gethin Pryce (Cerith Flinn), supporting Bex through her attempted suicide, briefly reconciling with Martin and stealing money from step-grandmother Dot Cotton (June Brown) to help pay off Martin's hit-and-run victim who had been blackmailing her. In 2021, Sonia is led to believe that she has reunited with her father Terry, whom she never knew. However, this is revealed to be a lie as the man posing as her parent is actually Tom "Rocky" Cotton (Brian Conley).

Storylines
1993–2007
Sonia and her family move to Albert Square. She is the third of Carol Jackson's (Lindsey Coulson) four children and the result of her mother's relationship with Terry Cant, whom Sonia never knew and who was violent towards Carol. During her childhood, she becomes close friends with Clare Tyler (Gemma Bissix) and the two are inseparable until Clare falls in with the wrong crowd at school and starts bullying Sonia but they reconcile before Clare leaves in 1998. Sonia has sex with Martin Fowler (James Alexandrou) but starts dating Jamie Mitchell (Jack Ryder). Not knowing she is pregnant, Sonia goes into labour and gives birth to Martin's daughter. The baby, who is named Chloe,  is subsequently given up for adoption and renamed Rebecca, despite protests from Martin's mother Pauline Fowler (Wendy Richard). However, Sonia becomes obsessed with her daughter and abducts her, locking herself in her house with the baby. Despite pleas from Rebecca's adoptive parents, it is Sonia's step-grandmother, Dot Cotton (June Brown), who persuades Sonia to return the baby.

Sonia and Jamie get engaged, but due to Jamie's fling with Zoe Slater (Michelle Ryan) and constant rowing, the relationship ends. Sonia dates Gus Smith (Mohammed George), who plans to propose, but he is devastated when Sonia reconciles with Jamie after he is brutally assaulted by his godfather Phil (Steve McFadden). Sonia helps him, nursing him through his injuries and they decide to marry but their happiness is short-lived as Martin accidentally hits Jamie with his vehicle. Sonia keeps a bedside vigil and is with Jamie when he dies.

Sonia eventually forgives Martin and as they grow closer, they fall in love and eventually elope. Sonia begins nursing training and she and Martin live with Pauline but struggle to cope with her interference. Martin gets unwittingly involved with a stalker, Sarah Cairns (Alison Pargeter), who tries to ruin his marriage. This culminates in Sarah holding Sonia and Martin hostage and stabbing Martin, until Sonia knocks her unconscious. Sonia and Martin face further upset when they discover that their daughter's adoptive parents have died in a car crash. They visit Rebecca's (Jade Sharif) guardian, Margaret Wilson (Janet Amsden), hiding their true identity but when Margaret realises who they are, she asks them to leave. Pauline also interferes and visits Rebecca with Martin. Sonia is furious when she learns this and animosity in the Fowlers' home puts a strain on Martin and Sonia's relationship so she spends her time with a colleague, Naomi Julien (Petra Letang); feelings develop and they begin an affair. Martin is heartbroken when his marriage ends and the situation is complicated further by Rebecca, who, on Margaret's request, is spending more time at the Fowlers'. Margaret decides to make the Fowlers' Rebecca's legal guardians but does not include Sonia when she finds out about her lesbian fling. Margaret dies and Martin takes custody of Rebecca and Pauline tries to stop Sonia having any contact with Rebecca. This makes Sonia distraught and preoccupied with Rebecca. Feeling neglected, Naomi ends their relationship.

Sonia becomes depressed and begins to neglect her work and drink alcohol, until Gus helps her straighten her life out. Sonia and Gus begin a second romance, which ends due to Sonia's lingering feelings for Martin. Sonia and Martin receive their divorce papers. However, both regret getting divorced and they reconcile. Pauline eventually finds out and tells Martin that she is dying from a brain tumour to stop him moving in with Sonia. Just as Pauline intends, Martin ends his relationship with Sonia in order to care for her, but when the truth finally comes out, a furious Martin moves out anyway. Pauline responds with ire, threatening to cut her son from her life. Sonia tries to build bridges with Pauline but an argument ends with Sonia slapping Pauline. When Pauline is found dead later that day, Sonia fears that she caused her death. She discovers that Rebecca witnessed the slap and tries to silence her daughter, but Rebecca tells Dot at Pauline's funeral. Appalled, Martin refuses Sonia access to Rebecca. Fearing imprisonment, Sonia abducts Rebecca and goes on the run. Martin is frantic, but days later Sonia returns and she is arrested on a murder charge; however, that same night Dot uncovers the identity of Pauline's real murderer — Pauline's husband Joe Macer (Ray Brooks), who had argued with Pauline on Christmas Day and struck her over the head, causing her death. Sonia is released and decides to leave Walford for Manchester. After making peace with Martin, she takes a taxi and is about to leave Walford when she sees Martin and Rebecca obstructing the road; Martin has decided that he wants to go with Sonia. The Fowlers reunite and leave as a family. They remarry and spend time touring the USA before settling in Manchester.

2010–2011
Bianca invites Sonia and Martin to her wedding to Ricky Butcher (Sid Owen) and Sonia attends alone. She rejects a phone call from Martin and gets very drunk. The following day, Sonia walks in on Dot slapping her granddaughter Dotty Cotton (Molly Conlin) across the legs, leading to Dot's arrest, though she is released without charge. Bianca notices Sonia has continuously avoided talking about Martin and Rebecca. Sonia visits Jamie's grave and later returns to The Queen Victoria pub, and drunkenly berates Phil, Jamie's godfather, about his treatment of Jamie. Phil says he considers Jamie to be one of his own children and tells Sonia to go upstairs to sober up. She misunderstands him and gets into his bed, naked. As Phil sees Sonia in bed, Shirley Carter (Linda Henry) walks in and slaps Phil across the face. Sonia confides in Carol about her marriage problems and Carol advises her to try to stay together for Rebecca's sake. After Ricky and Bianca's wedding, Sonia decides she must make a fresh start with Martin and leaves again. Sonia returns in January 2011, following Bianca's disappearance following her attack on Connor Stanley (Arinze Kene), who had also dating Whitney. She reveals to Ricky and Carol that Bianca has been hiding out with her at a B&B and is not in a good way. Ricky suggests getting Bianca out of the country but Sonia tells him she that Bianca has decided to give herself up. During a conversation with Carol, Sonia reveals she and Martin are no longer together and she and Rebecca are back living in London while Martin remains in Manchester. Carol is surprised but Sonia tells her the split occurred around the time of Billie's death and did not want to burden her with her problems. After Bianca hands herself in, Sonia leaves again.

2014–present
In January 2014, Carol informs Sonia, who is having marital problems with Martin again, about her breast cancer diagnosis. Carol has the BRCA gene and Sonia finds out she has inherited it. Sonia kisses Tina Carter (Luisa Bradshaw-White), which Tina's girlfriend, Fiona "Tosh" Mackintosh (Rebecca Scroggs), finds out about, so Tina end her friendship with Sonia to protect her relationship. Sonia, who has started a weight loss class, arranges to have a gastric band in Bulgaria, telling friends and family she is on a course. When she returns, she tries to confess to her class but collapses before she can do so. Sonia and Martin (now played by James Bye) separate and Sonia starts to feel isolated and depressed. Sonia is supported by Tina but Sonia backs away when Tina goes to kiss her as Sonia is unsure of her feelings.

Martin moves back into the area and Rebecca (now played by Jasmine Armfield) moves in with him, as she resents Sonia for leaving Martin. Martin believes he can repair his marriage, but Tina and Sonia share a kiss, which Martin sees. He tells everyone in The Vic about Sonia and Tina, but Sonia ends their relationship. Martin sends Rebecca, who now wants to be called Bex, to live with Sonia so she can spend more time with her mother. Sonia also repairs her relationship with Tina. Martin moves in with Stacey Slater (Lacey Turner), while Sonia and Tina embark on a full relationship. Sonia and Martin's divorce is finalised. After Tina drunkenly humiliates Sonia at an awards ceremony and Sonia rejects her, Tina has sex with Sophie Dodd (Poppy Rush) and regrets it, but before she can tell Sonia, Sonia reveals she has found a lump in her breast. Sonia forgives Tina for the humiliation, but Sophie tells Sonia that Tina cheated and their relationship ends, but they soon reunite. After having her breast lump checked, Sonia is given the all-clear.

Sonia receives a lucrative job offer at a private hospital in Kettering and, having realised she no longer loves Tina, ends their relationship. Bex is furious and thinks Sonia is abandoning her. Bex later calms down and she says an emotional farewell. Several months later, following Madison Drake (Seraphina Beh), Alexandra D'Costa (Sydney Craven) and her former friend Louise Mitchell (Tilly Keeper) continuously bullying Bex, Sonia returns after Bex phones her in tears. Sonia accuses Martin and Stacey of not caring about Bex and tells Martin she wants Bex to live with her. Sonia meets Bex's teachers before returning to Kettering. Sonia returns to Walford and lets herself into Dot's house, finding Dot on the floor after tripping. Sonia and Robbie, who has also returned, move in with Dot to help care for her. It is revealed that Sonia is hiding a secret from her time in Kettering meaning she no longer wants to return there. Although Sonia wants Bex to move in with them, Bex chooses to stay with Martin and Stacey.

Sonia starts dating Bex's teacher Gethin Pryce (Cerith Flinn) but is unaware that Bex is infatuated with him. Bex and Gethin kiss and after Bex's attempts to pursue him and he eventually confesses to Sonia. Gethin subsequently resigns his job at the school and leaves Walford, and Sonia tells Bex that she has done nothing wrong. In December 2017, Sonia discovers Kim Fox (Tameka Empson) having a miscarriage and supports her when she believes that she has left her husband Vincent Hubbard (Richard Blackwood) down. In January 2018, it is discovered that Stacey has slept with Max, which subsequently fractures Martin and Stacey's relationship. Stacey kicks Martin out and Sonia agrees for him to move into No. 25 with her and Bex. Sonia discovers that she may still be in love Martin and agrees to go on a date with him. However Martin still has feelings for Stacey, which upsets Sonia. When Bex decides that she doesn't want to go to university, Sonia pressures Bex into applying to Oxbridge University, much to Bex's annoyance. Bex tells Sonia that she is feeling upset since her boyfriend Shakil Kazemi (Shaheen Jafargholi) was killed and that she isn't ready for university, and Sonia supports Bex's decision. Sonia and Dot care for Harold Legg (Leonard Fenton) when he becomes ill and he moves into No.25. A swastika is graffitied on Dot's door which causes Dr Legg to fall into a panic attack. Sonia blames Dot's new lodger Stuart Highway (Ricky Champ) for the attack and threatens to report him to the police if she comes anywhere near No. 25. However Stuart is innocent and the perpetrators behind the attack are young youths. Sonia's niece Tiffany Butcher (Maisie Smith) is involved in a drug ring and Sonia discovers this when Bernadette Taylor (Clair Norris) informs her. Sonia and the Brannings try to help Tiffany and promise to pay off the drug dealers that Tiffany and her friend Evie Steele (Sophia Capasso) owe money to, in order for Tiffany to stay. Tiffany discovers that Sonia is lying and attempts to leave, but Sonia stops her from leaving causing Tiffany to slap her. They lock Tiffany in and finally release her when she agrees to speak up about the drug ring.

When Bex takes an overdose, Sonia finds her and is dismayed when she realises it was a suicide attempt. She blames herself. Martin returns to Walford and Sonia is angry with Martin for being absent. She is forced to give him a false alibi when police question him about stolen vehicles and convinces him to tell the truth.  She forgives him but Martin's behaviour continues and he is injured during an attack so Sonia throws him out. She forgives him again and realises that she still has feelings for him. When Martin and Charlie "Tubbs" Savage (Tayla Kovacevic-Ebong) knock down George Watson (Jack Bennett), Sonia visits George in hospital to question him about the hit-and-run. Upon realising Sonia and Martin are in a relationship, George blackmails Sonia and threatens to report Martin to the police unless she gives him £10,000. Sonia steals the money from Dot's bank account. Dot later leaves a message to Sonia as she believes that Martin is the thief.

In June 2020, Sonia decides she wants to get in touch with her birth father, Terry Cant. However, the subsequent COVID-19 lockdown means that she is busier than ever at the hospital, which leaves Sonia stressed and exhausted. When Ian Beale (Adam Woodyatt) makes light of the pandemic, Sonia snaps at him and visits family aboard in early 2021. On her 36th birthday, Sonia meets Tom "Rocky" Cotton (Brian Conley) who is masquerading as her father, Terry but is actually working in cahoots with Dotty Cotton (Milly Zero) to con Sonia who is in control of Dotty inheritance since Sonia has power of attorney. He lies to her that he loved Carol but Sonia is unwilling to build bridges due to Terry’s treatment of Carol when they were together- however, Sonia does warm to him until she finds out the truth. A devastated Sonia rejects Rocky although she does form a warm relationship with Rocky’s partner Kathy Beale (Gillian Taylforth). She also reluctantly allows her childhood friend Janine Butcher (Charlie Brooksj to live with her in Dot’s house for a few months and supports her when Janine falls pregnant. Sonia often acts as the voice of reason to Janine during this time, encouraging her to be honest with her partner Mick Carter (Danny Dyer) rather than reverting to her usual scheming ways. Out of concern for Janine, Sonia calls her former brother-in-law (and Janine’s brother) Ricky back to Walford.

On 1 December 2022, Sonia receives a phone call from Ireland with the news that Dot has died. Devastated, Sonia announces this in the Queen Victoria pub and although she puts on a brave face, she breaks down in private. She then sets about arranging Dot’s funeral and shares her memories of Dot with others. She later inherits the majority of Dot’s estate, including her house, much to her disbelief and Dotty’s anger, which results in Dotty departing the square on bad terms with Sonia.

Creation

1994 was a "historic" year for EastEnders, as in April, a third weekly episode was introduced. Due to the programme's increased frequency, a number of new characters were introduced to the regular cast in the latter part of 1993 and early 1994. Among them were the Jackson family: mother Carol (Lindsey Coulson), her four children, Bianca (Patsy Palmer), Robbie (Dean Gaffney), Sonia (Natalie Cassidy), and Billie (Devon Anderson), as well as Carol's partner Alan Jackson (Howard Antony). Though Carol and Alan were not initially married in the serial, and though Alan was only the biological father of Billie, the whole family took on Alan's surname. The family was created by writer Tony McHale.

Various members of the family began to appear sporadically from November 1993 onwards, but in episodes that aired early in 1994, the Jacksons moved from Walford Towers, a block of flats, to the soap's focal setting of Albert Square. Their slow introduction was a deliberate attempt by the programme makers to introduce the whole family over a long period. The Jacksons have been described by EastEnders scriptwriter Colin Brake as a "classic problem family".

Cassidy was 10 years old when she joined the soap as Sonia. She was spotted doing improvisations at the Anna Scher Theatre School by Tony McHale and EastEnders' Casting Advisor Jane Deitch. They liked Cassidy and she was asked to audition at Elstree studios, after which she was offered the part. None of the actors cast as the Jackson family were matched for appearance or screen compatibility. Cassidy commented, "it was all decided without doing that. I don't think it particularly mattered that none of us Jackson kids looked like each other because all our characters had different dads!"

Development
Early on in the character's narrative, Sonia was given a trumpet to play, which she did badly, infuriating her family and neighbours. According to Cassidy, this was on the behest of Storyliner and future Executive Producer of EastEnders, John Yorke. Cassidy revealed that she took lessons to play the trumpet, but that when she began to play well, she was asked by the producers to pretend to play it badly as Sonia was supposed to be playing it badly. Other storylines included a period where Sonia was bullied by her friend Clare Bates (Gemma Bissix) after she fell in with the wrong crowd at school. Despite the bullying storyline, Cassidy said that she and Bissix were good friends during their time together on the soap.

In 1997, the actress who played Sonia's mother Carol decided to quit EastEnders. It was at this stage that the producers made a decision to write the majority of the Jackson family out. Cassidy commented, "I thought I was out of a job [on EastEnders] forever!". Cassidy made several temporary returns on-screen months later to visit Clare or Bianca, but she was still uncertain about the future of her character: "I didn't come back to the show for about four months or so after [ I was written out in 1997]. And after Clare left the Square [in 1998] I was gone for another eight months. I just got on with school and all that". However, later in 1998 the producers asked Cassidy to return to the serial full-time, which she said she was "thrilled" about.

Departure (2007)
In April 2006, it was announced that Cassidy would take a break from EastEnders, saying "it's time to try new things. But it doesn't mean Sonia won't be back". A BBC spokesperson added, "Natalie is a valued member of the EastEnders cast and we wish her all the very best during her break from the show". Sonia departed on screen in February 2007, along with her former husband Martin, as his actor, James Alexandrou, also left the serial. Their departing storyline was the culmination of the death of Pauline Fowler, following actress Wendy Richard's high-profile resignation from the serial in 2006. In the storyline, Pauline dies in suspicious circumstances and Sonia is blamed for killing her, although Sonia is eventually vindicated when Pauline's husband Joe Macer (Ray Brooks) admits to manslaughter. Sonia and Martin and their daughter Rebecca leave Walford as a united family for the United States. In 2010, Cassidy said one of the reasons she decided to leave the show was because of Sonia's affair with Naomi Julien (Petra Letang), saying it was wrong for the character.

Despite Cassidy's departure being specified as a "break", Cassidy commented in 2008, "I feel that door's closed now and I need to go and do other stuff [...] Maybe in nine years I might go back." More recently, in 2009, press reports suggested that the actress was keen to reprise the role. Patsy Palmer, who returned to EastEnders as Sonia's sister Bianca, publicly called for the actress's return: "I would love her to come back. I mean, she is family! I've told bosses that it's a good time, when you think about it, as the Jacksons are back now as well."

Guest stints (2010–2011)
On 25 October 2009 it was announced that Cassidy would return to the soap to reprise her role as Sonia, along with Coulson, Gaffney and Anderson. The characters would reunite with Bianca who returned in 2008. Cassidy is quoted as saying "To be invited back to EastEnders is such an honour and I am very, very excited that Sonia is coming back. For me, to be reunited with the original Jacksons is a dream come true and I think it will be a fantastic storyline." A source told entertainment website Digital Spy: "Everything's being kept hush-hush about the Jacksons' return at the moment, but there are certainly a load of questions to be answered. Will the frosty relationship between Carol and Bianca thaw? Are Sonia and Martin still together? And how will Robbie react when he learns of his beloved Wellard's death? Everyone's so pleased to have them back." The family returned for Bianca's second wedding to Ricky Butcher as part of the show's 25th anniversary. Executive producer Diederick Santer explained that he wanted great stories to get people talking, saying "The wedding is the perfect opportunity for us to bring back the much-loved Jackson characters – Carol, Sonia, Robbie and Billie." In December 2010, it was announced Cassidy would return to EastEnders, as Sonia in order to facilitate a temporary storyline departure for co-star Palmer, who was due to take maternity leave. Sonia's one-off return was broadcast on 21 January 2011.

Reintroduction (2014)
Sonia returned permanently on 14 January 2014.

In February 2016, Cassidy announced she was expecting her second child, meaning she would be taking maternity leave. Cassidy confirmed the baby is due in "summer" 2016. It was expected that Cassidy would leave in spring 2016, with Sonia departing on-screen in summer 2016. Sonia departed on-screen on 20 September 2016. After returning for a short stint from 14 April 2017 to 18 April 2017, Cassidy returned to the role of Sonia permanently, with the return being broadcast on 27 June 2017.

Reception
Natalie Cassidy won the award for "Best Actress" for the role of Sonia, at the 2001 British Soap Awards''. Additionally, in 2004, Cassidy was awarded "best dramatic performance by a young actor or actress" for the role.

Referencing Sonia's foray into lesbianism in 2005, TV critic Grace Dent branded the character "the worst lesbian ever", adding, "The only lesbians with less lesbian tendencies than you are the women on the front cover of the Horny Triple-X Lesbian Specials which they keep at eye level by the sweets in my corner shop. Time to make a u-turn."

Lesbian website AfterEllen.com was also critical of the storyline that saw Sonia experimenting with her sexuality and then returning to her heterosexual orientation shortly after. Sharon Hadrian writes:

See also
List of EastEnders characters (1993)
List of media portrayals of bisexuality
List of LGBT characters in television and radio
List of fictional nurses
List of soap opera villains

References

External links

Fictional nurses
Fictional bisexual females
Television characters introduced in 1993
Fictional waiting staff
Fictional teenage parents
Female villains
Female characters in television
Fictional LGBT characters in television
Beale family (EastEnders)
Teenage characters in television
Fictional thieves
LGBT villains
Child characters in television
Branning family